Kevin McNab (born 21 February 1978) is an Australian equestrian. He competed in the individual eventing and team eventing at the 2020 Summer Olympics in Tokyo. The team of Andrew Hoy on Vassily de Lassos, Shane Rose on Virgil and Kevin McNab on Don Quidam won silver. Riding on Don Quidam, McNab finished inside the top 15 in the individual eventing competition.

Since January 2010 McNab has had 279 starts and 21 wins in eventing. He has had 33 starts in jumping.

At the Le Lion d'Angers World Championship, in October 2019, McNab was ranked 9th on Halo. He was eliminated when competing in the 2020 event.

References

1978 births
Living people
Australian event riders
Equestrians at the 2020 Summer Olympics
Olympic equestrians of Australia
Australian male equestrians
Olympic silver medalists for Australia
Olympic medalists in equestrian
Medalists at the 2020 Summer Olympics
21st-century Australian people